Super Request was a weeknight radio program broadcast by Australian national youth radio broadcaster Triple J.  The show aired Monday to Thursday between 6pm and 9pm and Fridays from 6pm to 10pm, due to there being no Home & Hosed on Fridays.

The show premiered in January 1998 with host Jane Gazzo and finished up in 2011 with long-time host Rosie Beaton. Prior to that, it was known as the Request Fest.  Past hosts have included Catriona Rowntree, Michael Tunn and Caroline Tran. Gaby Brown was a former regular fill-in presenter.  
(The name Super Request was coined by Gazzo after a trip to Japan in late ‘97)

Each day had regular segments which included a broadcast of a Live at the Wireless set on Mondays.

On Friday the most requested tracks of the week were revealed.

Rosie Beaton presented her last Super Request show on 9 December 2011 live from the University of Sydney's Manning Bar in Sydney.

For 2012, Super Request has been replaced by Good Nights, hosted by Linda Marigliano.

External links
Super Request at the Triple J site

Triple J programs